Stephen Menn (born 1964) is Professor of Philosophy  at McGill University and, between 2011 and 2015, was Professor of Ancient and Contemporary Philosophy at Humboldt University of Berlin and the author of Descartes and Augustine about the origin of Descartes' cogito. His specialties include ancient philosophy (Plato, Aristotle, Stoicism and neo-Platonism), medieval philosophy (Western and Islamic). He is also a mathematician, holding a doctorate in Mathematics from Johns Hopkins University in  1985 and one in  Philosophy from University of Chicago in 1989.

Menn is the son of linguist Lise Menn, the widow of William Bright, and is the step-brother of writer Susie Bright.

Books
Menn, Stephen. Plato on God As Nous. Carbondale: Southern Illinois University Press, 1995. 
Menn, Stephen. Descartes and Augustine, Cambridge University Press, 1998; revised paperback edition, 2002
Menn, Stephen. The Aim and the Argument of Aristotle's Metaphysics (draft).

See also
 Stoic categories
 List of American philosophers

References

External links
Official page at  McGill University 
Official page at Humboldt-Berlin, includes full bibliography 
__notoc__

American philosophers
Academic staff of McGill University
1964 births
Living people
American scholars of ancient Greek philosophy